Wim Kiekens (Aalst, 26 February 1968) is a Belgian retired footballer.

Honours 
Royal Antwerp

 Belgian Cup: 1991-92
 UEFA Cup Winners' Cup: 1992-93 (runners-up)

References 

Living people
1968 births
Belgian footballers
Association football defenders
Royal Antwerp F.C. players
R.W.D. Molenbeek players
Fortuna Sittard players